555% is the fourth solo album by the English rock musician Ginger Wildheart. The full album of thirty tracks was only available online for a limited time; a 12-track version of the album titled 100% has been released commercially.

Background
The album was recorded over three sessions in England, France, and Denmark during October 2011 and January 2012. Funding for the recording of the album was raised by Ginger's Triple Album Project managed through PledgeMusic. When the project raised significantly more money than Ginger had estimated would be required to record the album, he announced that the album would be titled 555% when donations reached that percentage of the original goal. The success of the fundraising effort encouraged Ginger to make extra songs available online while offering special CD and vinyl packages to contributors. Via the PledgeMusic website, persons who pledged money to the project were allowed to download completed tracks before they were released in other forms.

The first track to be made available for download by pledgers was the rough mix of "You're The One, You're The One, Yeah, I Know You're The One, You're The One (Yeah I Know You're The One)." The thirty tracks recorded for the project were made available to pledgers in three batches of ten, on 23 March, 30 March, and 6 April 2012 respectively. On each date, the tracks were made available at 5:55 pm England time.

555% Track listing

100%
Persons who downloaded tracks from the PledgeMusic site were encouraged to vote for their four favorite songs out of each batch of ten. The twelve most popular songs were selected for the commercial version of the album, titled 100% and released in May 2012. The other eighteen tracks are now unavailable on CD but can be purchased as downloads via Ginger's official Bandcamp page.

100% reached #9 on the UK midweek album chart on 27 June 2012.

100% Track listing

Personnel
According to updates on the PledgeMusic website, the following personnel took part in the sessions:
Ginger - vocals, guitar
"Random" Jon Poole - bass, vocals
Chris Catalyst - Guitar, Bass, vocals
Denzel - drums (CD1 - tracks 1, 2 & 10, CD2 - tracks 1, 4, 8 & 10, CD3 - tracks 6, 7 & 10)
Fyfe Ewing - drums (CD1 - tracks 4, 5 & 9, CD2 - tracks 3, 6, 7 & 9, CD3 - tracks 3, 4 & 8)
Ritch Battersby - drums (CD1 - tracks 3, 6, 7 & 8, CD2 - tracks 2 & 5, CD3 - tracks 1, 2, 5 & percussion on 9)
Willie Dowling - keyboards CD1 track 3, 4, 5, & 9 CD2 track 2, 3, 5, 6 7 & 9 CD3 track 1, 3, 4, 6 8 & 9, Guitars, vocals
C. J. - guitar, vocals (CD1 - tracks 6, 7 & 8)
Victoria Liedtke - vocals
Laila K - vocals (CD2 - track 2)
Jase Edwards - Guitar (CD2 track 6 and CD3 track 6 - guitar solo)
Kim Olesen - Keyboards on CD1 track 1, 2, 6, 7, 8 & 10. CD2 track 1, 4, 8 & 10 CD3 track 2, 5, 7 & 10.

Production team
Willie Dowling - producer, mixing (produced 15 Songs, mixed 13 songs)
Jacob Hansen - producer, mixing (15 Songs)
Jase Edwards - mixing (2 songs)
Jon Astley - mastering

References

External links 
The Wildhearts • View topic - Triple album, what we know so far.. - Transcribed album lyrics

Ginger (musician) albums
Albums produced by Jacob Hansen
2012 albums